The 1983–84 Detroit Red Wings season was the Red Wings' 52nd season, the franchise's 58th.

Offseason
The Red Wings drafted Steve Yzerman in the first round, fourth overall.

Regular season

Final standings

Schedule and results

Playoffs

Since they last made it into the playoffs in 1978, they made it again this season but lost in the first round in a best of five series by St. Louis in 4 games, or 1-3.

Player statistics

Regular season
Scoring

Goaltending

Playoffs
Scoring

Goaltending

Note: GP = Games played; G = Goals; A = Assists; Pts = Points; +/- = Plus-minus PIM = Penalty minutes; PPG = Power-play goals; SHG = Short-handed goals; GWG = Game-winning goals;
      MIN = Minutes played; W = Wins; L = Losses; T = Ties; GA = Goals against; GAA = Goals-against average;  SO = Shutouts;

Awards and records
 Bill Masterton Memorial Trophy: || Brad Park

Draft picks

References
Red Wings on Hockey Database

Detroit Red Wings seasons
Detroit
Detroit
Detroit Red
Detroit Red